Jamie Ingram (born 23 March 1998) is an English international swimmer. He has represented England at the Commonwealth Games and won a silver medal.

Biography
Ingram educated at the University of Manchester won the bronze medal in the 100 metres butterfly, posting a personal best of 52.46 at the 2022 British Swimming Championships. He had previously won a gold & a silver in the 100m freestyle and butterfly at the British Universities and Colleges Championships.

In 2022, he was selected for the 2022 Commonwealth Games in Birmingham where he competed in two events; the men's 100 metres butterfly and the men's 4x100m freestyle relay, winning a silver medal as part of the team.

References

External links

1998 births
Living people
English male swimmers
British male swimmers
Swimmers at the 2022 Commonwealth Games
Commonwealth Games medallists in swimming
Commonwealth Games silver medallists for England
20th-century English people
21st-century English people
Medallists at the 2022 Commonwealth Games